Rashan (also Romanized as Rashān and Ra’shān; also known as Raqshān) is a village in Qarah Kahriz Rural District, Qarah Kahriz District, Shazand County, Markazi Province, Iran. At the 2006 census, its population was 398, in 91 families.

References 

Populated places in Shazand County